Pacific Air Lines Flight 773 was a Fairchild F27A Friendship airliner that crashed on May 7, 1964, near Danville, California, a suburb east of Oakland. The Thursday morning crash was most likely the first instance in the United States of an airliner's pilots being shot by a passenger as part of a mass murder–suicide. Francisco Paula Gonzales, 27, shot both pilots before turning the gun on himself, causing the plane to crash, killing all 44 aboard.

, the crash of Flight 773 remains the worst incident of mass murder in modern California history, one death more than the subsequent Pacific Southwest Airlines Flight 1771 hijacking in 1987.

Events preceding the flight
Francisco Gonzales, a warehouse worker living in San Francisco, had been "disturbed and depressed" over marital and financial difficulties in the months preceding the crash. Gonzales was deeply in debt and nearly half of his income was committed to loan repayment, and he had informed both relatives and friends that he "would die on either Wednesday, the 6th of May, or Thursday, the 7th of May." In the week preceding the crash, Gonzales referred to his impending death on a daily basis, and purchased a Smith & Wesson Model 27 .357 Magnum revolver through a friend of a friend, with serial number S201645.

The evening before the crash, before boarding a flight to Reno, Nevada, Gonzales had shown the gun to numerous friends at the airport and told one person that he intended to shoot himself. Gonzales gambled in Reno the night before the fatal flight and told a casino employee that he did not care how much he lost because "it won't make any difference after tomorrow."

Aircraft
The plane, a twin-engined turboprop Fairchild F-27, registration N2770R, was a U.S.-built version of the Fokker F-27 Friendship airliner. Manufactured five years earlier in 1959, it had accumulated about 10,250 flight hours up to its final flight, with Pacific Air Lines as the sole owner and operator.

Flight
The F-27 took off from Reno at 5:54 am PDT, with 33 passengers aboard, including Gonzales, and a crew of three, bound for San Francisco International Airport, with a scheduled stop in Stockton, California. The crew consisted of Captain Ernest Clark, 52, pilot in command, First Officer Ray Andress, 31, copilot, and flight attendant Margaret Schafer, 30.

The plane arrived at Stockton, where two passengers deplaned and ten boarded, bringing the plane's total to 41 passengers. Both deplaning passengers reported that Gonzalez was seated directly behind the cockpit. About 6:38 am, Flight 773 lifted off and headed towards San Francisco International.

Murder-suicide

At 6:48:15, with the aircraft about ten minutes out of Stockton, the Oakland Air Route Traffic Control Center (ARTCC) received a high-pitched, garbled radio message from Flight 773, and the aircraft soon disappeared from the center's radar displays.

With Flight 773 minutes from landing, Gonzales, seated directly behind the cockpit, burst into the cockpit and shot both pilots twice. Gonzales's first bullet hit a tiny section of the frame tubing from Captain Clark's seat. His second bullet killed Clark instantly. He then shot First Officer Andress, critically wounding him. The wounded Andress made a last frantic transmission as he tried to pull the plane out of the dive. Gonzales most likely shot him again, fatally, before shooting himself, causing the plane to go into a final dive.

After attempting unsuccessfully to contact Flight 773, Oakland ARTCC asked another aircraft in the immediate vicinity, United Air Lines Flight 593, if they had the plane in sight. Flight 593's flight crew responded that they did not see Flight 773, but a minute later they reported: "There's a black, uh, cloud of smoke coming up through the undercast at, uh, three-thirty, four o'clock position right now. Looks like (an) oil or gasoline fire." Oakland ARTCC realized that the smoke spotted by the United air crew was likely caused by the crash of Pacific Air Lines Flight 773.

The plane erupted in flames on impact and dug a crater into the ground. Flight 773's last radio message, from First Officer Andress, was deciphered through laboratory analysis: "I've been shot! We've been shot! Oh, my God, help!"

The official accident report stated that witnesses along the flight path and near the impact area described "extreme and abrupt changes in altitude of Flight 773 with erratic powerplant sounds" before the plane hit a sloping hillside at a relative angle of 90°.

Investigation
Investigators from the Civil Aeronautics Board (CAB, a forerunner organization to today's National Transportation Safety Board [NTSB]) found in the mangled wreckage a damaged Smith & Wesson Model 27 .357 Magnum revolver, holding six spent cartridges. The Federal Bureau of Investigation (FBI) soon joined the CAB in a search for evidence so that the apparent criminal aspects of the case could be pursued. Investigators found that when Gonzales left San Francisco for Reno the day before the fatal flight, he was carrying the .357, and that he had purchased $105,000 worth of life insurance at the San Francisco airport, payable to his wife. The probable cause stated in the CAB accident report was "the shooting of the captain and first officer by a passenger during flight", and the FBI determined that the suicidal Gonzales was the shooter.

Aftermath
Civil air regulation amendments became effective on August 6, 1964, that required that doors separating the passenger cabin from the crew compartment on all scheduled air carrier and commercial aircraft must be kept locked in flight. An exception to the rule remains during takeoff and landing on certain aircraft, such as the Fairchild F-27, where the cockpit door leads to an emergency passenger exit. The amendments were passed by the Federal Aviation Administration prior to the crash of Flight 773, but had not yet become effective.

See also 
 Pacific Southwest Airlines Flight 1771
 Federal Express Flight 705
 Accidents and incidents involving the Fokker F27 family
 Aviation safety
 List of accidents and incidents involving commercial aircraft
 List of aviation incidents involving terrorism
 
 List of homicides in California

References

Further reading
Serling, Robert J., Loud and Clear: The Full Answer to Aviation's Vital Question - Are the Jets Really Safe? Garden City, NY: Doubleday, 1969

External links
"Death Wish", Time, November 6, 1964

NTSB - brief incident summary
Photograph of a Pacific Air Lines F-27, similar to the one that crashed. 
Photograph of an open F-27 cargo door, located between the cockpit and passenger cabin, that also served as an emergency exit.

Civil Aeronautics Board Aircraft Accident Report

Airliner accidents and incidents involving deliberate crashes
1964 in California
Accidents and incidents involving the Fairchild F-27
Airliner accidents and incidents caused by hijacking
Airliner accidents and incidents in California
Aviation accidents and incidents in the United States in 1964
Disasters in California
History of Contra Costa County, California
Mass murder in 1964
Mass murder in California
Murder–suicides in the United States
Pacific Air Lines accidents and incidents
San Ramon, California
May 1964 events in the United States
Mass murder in the United States